is a 1958 Japanese drama and crime film directed by Yoshitarō Nomura, based on a story by Seicho Matsumoto.

Plot
After the murder of a pawnbroker, Tokyo detectives Shimooka and Yuki are sent to Kyushu, home of murder suspect Ishii's former girlfriend Sadako, as the police expect Ishii to make contact with her. While observing her house, Yuki starts to sympathise with Sadako, who lives in an unhappy marriage with her loveless businessman husband. When Ishii finally meets with Sadako, Yuki's initial presumption, that he might want to kill her and subsequently commit suicide, is proven wrong. Sadako, regretting their once parting, asks Ishii to allow her to go with him, but Ishii, ill with tuberculosis, declines. The police arrest Ishii, leaving behind a grieving Sadako.

Cast
 Seiji Miyaguchi as Shimooka
 Minoru Ōki as Yuki
 Hideko Takamine as Sadako
 Takahiro Tamura as Ishii
 Hizuru Takachiho as Yumiko
 Kin Sugai as Mrs. Shimooka
 Kumeko Urabe as landlady
 Ryōhei Uchida as Yamada
 Kamatari Fujiwara as Yumiko's father
 Tomoko Fumino as Yumiko's mother
 Miki Odagiri as maid
 Kazuko Yamamoto as maid
 Masao Shimizu as Sadako's husband

Awards
1958 Kinema Junpo Award, Blue Ribbon Award and Mainichi Film Award for Best Screenplay (Shinobu Hashimoto).

Legacy
Matsumoto's story was repeatedly adapted for television in later years. Some of these adaptations stayed closer to the original story, which has only one detective, Yuki, observe Sadako, while others took over Hashimoto's idea to present two detectives.

References

External links
 
 

1958 films
1958 crime drama films
Japanese black-and-white films
Japanese crime drama films
Films based on short fiction
Films directed by Yoshitaro Nomura
Shochiku films
1950s Japanese films